Church of St Mary Magdalene is a  Grade I listed church in Melchbourne, Bedfordshire, England. It became a listed building on 13 July 1964. The church is one of the Stodden Group of churches, which is a group of six parishes also including Dean (All Hallows’ Church), Pertenhall (St. Peter's church), Shelton (St. Mary's church), Swineshead (St. Nicholas's church) and Yelden (St. Mary's church).   The Stodden Group is part of the Sharnbrook Deanery within the diocese of St. Albans in the Church of England.

See also
Grade I listed buildings in Bedfordshire

References

Church of England church buildings in Bedfordshire
Grade I listed churches in Bedfordshire